A time horizon, also known as a planning horizon, is a fixed point of time in the future at which point certain processes will be evaluated or assumed to end.  It is necessary in an accounting, finance or risk management regime to assign such a fixed horizon time so that alternatives can be evaluated for performance over the same period of time. A time horizon is a physical impossibility in the real world.

Although short term horizons such as end of day, end of week, end of month matter in accounting, generally it is mere summing-up and the simplest mark to market processes that take place at these short term horizons.  No scenario analysis or mark to future activities are usually undertaken for such short periods, except for very large portfolios.

The most common horizons used in planning are one "quarter" (a quarter year, or three months), a year, two years, three years, four years (especially in a representative democracy where this is a quite common term of office and election cycle) and five years (in corporate planning). More far-sighted companies and government agencies may also use between ten and one hundred years. Thirty years is often used in mortgage contracts and US Treasury bonds such as the "long bond". The Forestry Commission in the UK plans over a century into the future.

Agreeing on a common time horizon for action is particularly important in global policy, as each participant will have very different time horizon habits.  Achieving simultaneous policy is quite difficult without an agreement, as those taking action early may be seriously disadvantaged in competition with those taking action late on a regulatory matter. One attempt to bring about a global simultaneous policy is being attempted by the International Simultaneous Policy Organization's SIMPOL campaign.

Also, in terms of physics, the term "time horizon" is also synonymous with event horizon, first identified in Stephen Hawking's A Brief History of Time. Hawking stated that the time horizon is the boundary that separates a black hole from other celestial bodies. Even time and light cannot escape once trapped in the black hole.

See also
Planning horizon
Gap financing
Race to the bottom
Timetable (disambiguation)
Time preference

References 

Business planning